La Tur was a Mexican airline that operated from 1988 until 1992 when it was taken over by TAESA.

Company history
Set up in 1988 to help develop the tourist market, La Tur began charter operations using McDonnell Douglas MD-83 aircraft.  One year later, the Airbus A300-600 was introduced for flights to Europe and Asia. Plans were made to replace the MD-83s with Airbus A320 and Airbus A321, but the financial situation did not allow it.

By 1992, La Tur had too much capacity, and the A300 was leased out. The fall of the Mexican peso and the deregulation of Mexican air transport led to the take over by TAESA.

Fleet details
5 McDonnell Douglas MD-83
1 McDonnell Douglas MD-87
1 Airbus A300B4-620 F-ODTK
1 Airbus A300B4-622R F-ODSX

Destinations
This is a list of airports that La Tur used to fly scheduled service to before it ceased operations in 1992.

China
Hong Kong - Kai Tak International Airport

Mexico
Acapulco - General Juan N. Álvarez International Airport
Cancun - Cancún International Airport
Mexico City - Benito Juarez International Airport
Puerto Vallarta - Lic. Gustavo Díaz Ordaz International Airport

Netherlands
Amsterdam - Schiphol International Airport

United States
Atlanta - William B. Hartsfield-Jackson Atlanta International Airport
New York - John F. Kennedy International Airport

References

External links
Fleet and Code information

Defunct airlines of Mexico
Charter airlines of Mexico
Airlines established in 1988
Airlines disestablished in 1992